Rüti GL railway station is a railway station serving the village of Rüti in the municipality of Glarus Süd in the Swiss canton of Glarus.The station is situated on the Weesen to Linthal railway line, and served by the hourly Zürich S-Bahn service S25 between Zurich and Linthal.

References

External links 
Rüti GL station on Swiss Federal Railway's web site

Rüti GL
Rüti GL